William Gordon Casselman (born 1942) is a Canadian writer and broadcaster. He has written about Canadian words, maintains a website about English etymology and a blog, The Casselmanual.

Bibliography
Casselman's Canadian Words: A Comic Browse through Words & Folk Sayings Invented by Canadians
1st edition 1995 Copp Clark 
2nd edition 1997 Little, Brown 
3rd edition 1999 McArthur & Company, 
Casselmania: More Wacky Canadian Words & Sayings 1996 Little, Brown, 
Canadian Garden Words, 1997, McArthur & Company, 
A Dictionary of Medical Derivations: The Real Meanings of Medical Words, 1998, Parthenon Publishing Group, 
Canadian Food Words: The Juicy Lore & Tasty Origins of Foods That Founded a Nation 1998, 1999 McArthur & Company 
The book was a recipient of the 1999 Canadian Culinary Book Award 
What's in a Canadian Name? The Origins and Meanings of Canadian Surnames, 2000 McArthur & Company, 
Canadian Sayings : 1200 Folk Sayings Used by Canadians, Collected and Annotated by Bill Casselman,1999 McArthur & Company, Toronto, Canada 
Canadian Sayings 2: 1000 Folk Sayings Used by Canadians, 2002 McArthur & Company,
Canadian Sayings 3: 1000 Folk Sayings Used by Canadians, 2004 McArthur & Company,
As The Canoe Tips: Comic Scenes from Canadian Life, 2005 McArthur & Company, 
Canadian Words & Sayings, 2006 McArthur & Company, 
Where a Dobdob Meets a Dikdik, 2010, Adams Media,  (also available in several e-book formats)
Excerpt: "I delight in the joy of odd bird names: <...> How about an authentic bird name such as the Sooty Boubou? Sooty Boubou. Sounds like something that must be cured by an injection of antibiotics, after being contracted during an unwise moment of carnality in a Nairobi outhouse."

References

1942 births
Living people
Canadian male non-fiction writers
Canadian philologists
Canadian humorists
People from Haldimand County
Canadian radio personalities
20th-century Canadian male writers
20th-century Canadian non-fiction writers
21st-century Canadian male writers
21st-century Canadian non-fiction writers